Martti Keel (born 30 January 1992) is an Estonian volleyball player. He was a member of the Estonian national team from 2011 to 2014 and represented his country at the 2011 European Volleyball Championships.

Keel started his professional career in club Pärnu VK.

His father is a volleyball player and coach Avo Keel. His brother is a volleyball player Markkus Keel.

References

Living people
1992 births
Estonian men's volleyball players
Estonian expatriate volleyball players
Estonian expatriate sportspeople in Finland
Expatriate volleyball players in Finland